Prime Minister Lee may refer to:
 Lee Kuan Yew (1923–2015), 1st Prime Minister of Singapore
 Lee Hsien Loong (born 1952), 3rd Prime Minister of Singapore and son of the 1st Prime Minister
 Prime Ministers of South Korea, such as:
 Lee Han-key, acting
 Lee Hyun-jae (born 1929)
 Lee Hoi-chang (born 1935)
 Lee Yung-dug (1926–2010)
 Lee Hong-koo (born 1934)
 Lee Soo-sung (born 1939)
 Lee Han-dong
 Lee Hae-chan (born 1952)
 Lee Wan-koo (born 1950)

See also
 Lee (name)
 Lee Huan (1917–2010), premier of the Republic of China
 Premier Li (disambiguation)
 President Lee (disambiguation)